Wakaleo pitikantensis is a species of carnivorous marsupial that was discovered at fossil sites in South Australia.

Taxonomy 
The description by Rauscher was published in 1987, naming a new species and genus as Priscileo pitikantensis.
The designation as the type species of the genus Priscileo was later recognised as a species of a revised description of Wakaleo.
Fossil material examined by Rauscher was obtained at Lake Pitikanta, situated to the east of Lake Eyre.

Description 
The smallest known species of Wakaleo, it lived in Australia about 25 million years ago, from the late Oligocene to middle Miocene, and was approximately the size of a cat.
They were mid-sized predators who probably hunted in trees or ambushed prey from a branch.
Like the later discovery, Wakaleo schouteni, the species possesses three premolars and four molars which distinguishes them from others of the genus. A little smaller than W. schouteni, this species also differs in the morphology of the humerus.

It is known only from a few post cranial bones and a poorly preserved maxillary fragment found at the Lake Pitikanta site of the Lake Ngapakaldi to Lake Palankarinna Fossil Area in northeastern South Australia. To date W. pitikantensis, Wakaleo schouteni and "Priscileo' roskellyae are the most ancient phylogenies of the Thylacoleonidae and presumed to have diverged during the early to middle Oligocene epoch.

References

External links
Natural Worlds
Mysterious Australia

Wakaleo
Species described in 1987
Carnivorous marsupials
Prehistoric mammals of Australia
Pleistocene mammals